Joel Villarino (born February 4, 1965 in San Carlos, Negros Occidental, Philippines) is a  Filipino football coach who manages Green Archers United F.C. He was also a former member of the Philippines national football team.

Competitive career
Villarino played for the Philippines national football team. He made an appearance at the 1998 FIFA World Cup qualifiers playing in the 0–5 loss to Qatar in September 1996.

Coaching career

Club
Joel Villarino has coached various teams having coached Pasargad F.C., the women's squad of Global F.C., Miriam College varsity team, and the Ateneo Futsal Club by 2013.

Pasargad
Villarino worked with Pasargad F.C. again as their head coach debuting in a United Football League match against Stallion for Pasargad in July 2016.

Kaya (2016 AFC Cup)
Serving as head coach Kaya FC only for the 2016 AFC Cup, Villarino led his team in the 0-1 loss to Kitchee SC in their first fixture, hosting Maldivian club New Radiant in their second, the first AFC Cup match Kaya hosted. This was followed by a 1-0 win over Balestier Khalsa in their third game, Villarino exuberant with the victory. The Filipino coach eventually led the club to book their place in the knockout stages, euphoric with results. However, in the round-of-16, his charges were defeated by Johor Darul Takzim 7-2; in spite of the scoreline, Villarino claimed it was 'an honor' to play against JDT.

Philippines women's national team
Villarino was appointed as the head coach of the Philippines women's national football team in September 2008 and was tasked to mentor the squad that will compete at the 2008 AFF Women's Championship.

References

1965 births
Filipino football head coaches
Living people
People from Negros Occidental
Philippines women's national football team managers
Philippines international footballers
Association footballers not categorized by position
Filipino footballers